The Patriotic Society was an organization under the Spanish Empire dedicated to Venzuelan independence. It amassed large influence in the country and abroad, dictating much of the early Venezuelan War of Independence. The organization ceased operations shortly after the Venezuelan Declaration of Independence, when most of its membership joined the militia army of the First Republic of Venezuela.

The society itself was organized in a manner similar to the Jacobins. It had a consistently changing presidency.

The Patriotic Society had itself a newspaper organ, called El Patriota de Venezuela where it disseminated messages in line with the organization's policies.

Its members were called "socios", which can be translated to "members" or "associates".

History

Background 
The independence of Venezuela was long sought by much of its population. Later, in 1795, the  occurred, but this too was also crushed. However, hope arrived as the Spanish were weakened by the French invasion of Spain. This hope soon manifested in the creation of the society.

Influence and organization 
Founded as the Sociedad de Agricultura y Economía, the society quickly promoted separatism. It advocated for separatism and pressured the First National Congress into action. The organization quickly accrued high-profile (or soon to be high-profile) members, amassing approximately 600 members in Caracas alone at a point.

The Patriotic Society had its headquarters in Caracas, and branches in Barcelona, Barinas, Valencia and Puerto Cabello. Its meetings discussed economics, politics, religious, and civil and military affairs.

Notable members
Below are members who would gain fame or recognition during the Venezuelan War of Independence:

References

Defunct political parties in Venezuela
Venezuelan War of Independence
History of Venezuela